Pan Shiyi (born 14 November 1963) is a Chinese businessman and he is Co-Founder and former Chairman of SOHO China. He co-founded SOHO China with his wife Zhang Xin in 1995. Alongside his wife, Pan's net worth is estimated at $3.5 billion. He stepped down from the role of Chairman on October 7 2022 “in order to focus on supporting the arts and philanthropic pursuits.”

Early life
Between 2016 and 2017, Pan was a Senior Fellow at the John F. Kennedy School of Government.

Personal life
Pan and his wife, Zhang Xin, have been members of the Baháʼí Faith since 2005.

Pan starred as a lonely real estate developer "Li Wenqing" in the 2006 romantic film Aspirin, alongside Mei Ting.

See also 
 Ren Zhiqiang

References 

1963 births
Living people
21st-century Bahá'ís
Chinese Bahá'ís
Chinese billionaires
Chinese real estate businesspeople
Converts to the Bahá'í Faith
Businesspeople from Gansu
People from Tianshui
Chinese male film actors
21st-century Chinese male actors
Male actors from Gansu
SOHO China people
20th-century Chinese businesspeople
21st-century Chinese businesspeople
Chinese company founders